Gregory Frank Taylor  is a retired Australian senior public servant, he was head of the Department of Primary Industries and Energy between 1993 and 1996. From 1997 to 2000 Taylor was Executive Director at the International Monetary Fund.

Career
Taylor was appointed to his first Secretary role at the head of the Department of Employment, Education and Training in 1989.

In 1993, he shifted to the Department of Primary Industries and Energy, and in 1996 to the Department of Industry, Science and Tourism. He was moved on from his role at the Department of Industry, Science and Tourism by the Howard Government at the end of 1996.

After leaving the Australian Public Service, Taylor was appointed an Executive Director at the International Monetary Fund (IMF). He started in the role just ahead of the Asian financial crisis. During his time at the IMF he represented the interests of Australia and a number of other countries, including Papua New Guinea. He completed his term on 31 October 2000.

Awards and honours
In June 1995, Taylor was appointed an Officer of the Order of Australia for public service to the development of economic and social policy.

The Australian National University named the Greg Taylor Scholarships in honour of Taylor, the scholarships make research opportunities available at the Development Policy Centre to emerging scholars of Papua New Guinea and the Pacific.

References

Living people
Year of birth missing (living people)
Australian public servants
Officers of the Order of Australia
Secretaries of the Australian Government Education Department